The Kosovo Fed Cup team represents Kosovo in Fed Cup tennis competition and are governed by the Tennis Federation of Kosovo. They took part in the Fed Cup for the first time in 2016, competing in the Europe/Africa Zone Group III.

History
On 28 March 2015, Tennis Europe granted membership to the Tennis Federation of Kosovo, which became effective in 2016. In December 2015, the Federation announced that it would compete at the 2016 Fed Cup in the Europe/Africa Zone Group III.

Kosovo would then compete two years later in the 2018 Fed Cup in the Europe/Africa Zone Group III facing in Pool B host Tunisia as well as Cyprus, Algeria and Madagascar as their opponents. Kosovo were able get one win against Madagascar through set wins from Arlinda Rushiti against Iariniaina Tsantaniony and in the Doubles with Blearta Ukëhaxhaj.
Kosovo finished their campaign in 8th place after losing against  Iceland in the playoffs.

The best result for Kosovo came at the 2019 Fed Cup in the Europe/Africa Zone Group III in Pool B where they faced Cyprus, North Macedonia as well as Algeria and Congo.  Kosovo won three matches in this group and only lost one match against Cyprus. Donika Bashota winning all four single matches in her campaign. Arlinda Rushiti winning three single matches. They impressively beat North Macedonia and Algeria both with 2-1 set wins. They finished second in the standings. In the Play-offs they faced Lithuania losing against them after two single matches, securing in the end a fourth-place finish.

Players

Matches

References

External links
 

Billie Jean King Cup teams
Fed Cup
Fed Cup